Never Gonna Be the Same may refer to songs by:

 "Never Gonna Be the Same", by Mia Wray, 2021
 "Never Gonna Be the Same", by Courtney Love from the 2004 album America's Sweetheart
 "Never Gonna Be the Same", by Sean Paul from the 2006 album The Trinity

See also
 Never Be the Same (disambiguation)
 Never Be the Same Again (disambiguation)